The Oberaarjoch (el. 3212 m.) is a high mountain pass across the eastern Bernese Alps, connecting the Fiescher Glacier in the canton of Valais to the Oberaar Glacier in the canton Bern. The pass is located between the Oberaarhorn on the north and the Oberaarrothorn on the south. Above the col, on the Valais side, lies the Oberaarjoch Hut.

The nearest settlements are Fieschertal (Valais) and Handegg (Bern).

See also
List of mountain passes in Switzerland

References

External links
Oberaarjoch on Hikr

Mountain passes of Switzerland
Mountain passes of the Alps
Mountain passes of Valais
Bern–Valais border
Mountain passes of the canton of Bern